George Sullivan may refer to:
 Red Sullivan (George Sullivan, born 1929), ice hockey player
 George Sullivan (New Hampshire politician) (1771–1838), member of the U.S. House of Representatives from New Hampshire
 George Sullivan (American football, born 1897) (1897–1989), American football player
 George Sullivan (American football, born 1926), American football player
 George Alexander Sullivan (1890–1942), founder of the Rosicrucian Fellowship
 George M. Sullivan (1922–2009), mayor of Anchorage, Alaska
 George H. Sullivan (1867–1935), Lt. Governor of Minnesota
 George F. Sullivan (1886–1944), U.S. federal judge
 George Thomas Sullivan (1914–1942), one of five Sullivan brothers who died together in World War II
 George Sullivan (fighter) (born 1981), mixed martial artist